Lonnie Demetrius Johnson (born February 14, 1971 in Miami, Florida) is a former American football tight end in the National Football League. He was drafted by the Buffalo Bills in the second round of the 1994 NFL Draft. He played college football at Florida State.

Johnson also played for the Kansas City Chiefs.

References

1971 births
Living people
Miami Senior High School alumni
American football tight ends
Florida State Seminoles football players
Buffalo Bills players
Kansas City Chiefs players
Players of American football from Miami